Bayravand or Chaghalvandi District is a district (bakhsh) in Khorramabad County, Lorestan Province, Iran. At the 2006 census, its population was 11,378, in 2,462 families.  The District has one city: Chaghalvandi.  The District contains two Rural Districts: Beyranvand-e Jonubi Rural District and Beyranvand-e Shomali Rural District.

References 

Districts of Lorestan Province
Khorramabad County